Kristi Kote (born 26 September 1998) is an Albanian professional footballer who currently play as a central midfielder for Albanian club Bylis Ballsh.

References

1998 births
Living people
People from Korçë
People from Korçë County
Albanian footballers
Association football midfielders
Kategoria Superiore players
KF Skënderbeu Korçë players
KF Liria players
Football Superleague of Kosovo players
FK Partizani Tirana players
Albanian expatriate footballers
Albanian expatriates
Albanian expatriates in Kosovo
Expatriates in Kosovo
Expatriate footballers in Kosovo